Ansan is a commune in the Gers department in southwestern France.

Geography 
Ansan is located in the canton of Auch-2 and in the arrondissement of Auch.

Population

See also
Communes of the Gers department

References

Communes of Gers